"Daddy's Little Girl" is a song played at weddings.

Daddy's Little Girl may also refer to:

 An especially cherished or spoiled daughter (see Electra complex)
 Daddy's Little Girl (novel), a 2002 novel by Mary Higgins Clark
 Daddy's Little Girl (film), a 2012 Australian horror thriller film
 Daddy's Little Girls, a 2007 American comedy film

Music
 Daddy's Little Girl (album), a 1991 album by Nikki D
 "Daddy's Little Girl" (Frankie J song), from his 2006 album Priceless
 "Daddy's Little Girl", a song by J. Cole

Television
 "Daddy's Little Girl" (CSI), a sixth-season episode of the crime drama CSI: Crime Scene Investigation
 "Daddy's Little Girl" (The 4400), a fourth-season episode of the science-fiction television series The 4400
 "Daddy's Little Girl", a third-season episode of Family Matters
 "Daddy's Little Monster", a fourth-season episode of Adventure Time, whose title is a play on the phrase "Daddy's Little Girl"

See also 
 "Daddy's Li'l Girl", a song by Bikini Kill
 Daddy's Little Girls, a 2007 romantic drama film by Tyler Perry, based on his eponymous stage play